Carlos French (August 6, 1835 – April 14, 1903) was a United States representative from Connecticut. He was born in Humphreysville, Connecticut (now known as Seymour, Connecticut), the son of Raymond French and Olive Curtis French. He attended the common schools of Seymour and General Russell’s Military School, New Haven, Connecticut. He engaged in manufacturing and is credited with inventing the spiral steel car spring and the corrugated volute spring.

French was a member of the Connecticut House of Representatives in 1860 and again in 1868. He was employed as the president and treasurer of the Fowler Nail Company from 1869 until his death and also the vice president of the H.A. Matthews Manufacturing Company. He was also the director the Union Horse Shoe Nail Company of Chicago, Illinois and of the Second National Bank of New Haven, Connecticut. In addition, he was the director of the Colonial Trust Company of Waterbury, Connecticut and of the New York, New Haven & Hartford Railroad Company.

French was a member of the Democratic National Committee and was elected as a Democrat to the Fiftieth Congress (March 4, 1887 – March 3, 1889). He was not a candidate for renomination in 1888. After leaving Congress, he resumed his former manufacturing pursuits and corporate connections. He died in Seymour, Connecticut in 1903 and was buried in Fair Haven Union Cemetery in New Haven, Connecticut.

References

1835 births
1903 deaths
People from Seymour, Connecticut
Democratic Party members of the Connecticut House of Representatives
Burials in Connecticut
Democratic Party members of the United States House of Representatives from Connecticut
19th-century American politicians